Arthur Eisenmenger (born 20 October 1914 in Basel, died 19 February 2002 in Eislingen) was a German former chief graphic designer for the European Community.

Amongst his artistic creations are implementations of the European flag, the CE mark, and the euro sign (€).

References

Currency designers
German graphic designers
1914 births
2002 deaths